Elise Aulinger (11 December 1881 – 12 February 1965) was a German stage, radio and film actress.

Selected filmography
 The Favourite of the Queen (1922)
 Martin Luther (1923)
 What the Stones Tell (1925)
 The Seventh Son (1926)
 Behind Monastery Walls (1928)
 The Love Express (1931)
 S.A.-Mann Brand (1933)
  Marriage Strike (1935)
 Der Kaiser von Kalifornien (1936)
 The Three Around Christine (1936)
 Travelling People (1938)
 Three Wonderful Days (1939)
 The Right to Love (1939)
 The Eternal Spring (1940)
 Krambambuli (1940)
 The Fire Devil (1940)
 Wunschkonzert (1940)
 The Sinful Village (1940)
 Anuschka (1942)
 The Little Residence (1942)
 A Salzburg Comedy (1943)
  Gaspary's Sons (1948)
 I'll Never Forget That Night (1949)
 Madonna in Chains (1949)
 The Violin Maker of Mittenwald (1950)
 Hanna Amon (1951)
  Border Post 58 (1951)
 One Night's Intoxication (1951)
 The Cloister of Martins (1951)
 The Last Shot (1951)
  The Crucifix Carver of Ammergau (1952)
 The Blue and White Lion (1952)
 The Imaginary Invalid (1952)
  Marriage Strike (1953)
 The Immortal Vagabond (1953)
 Fear (La Paura) (1954)
 The Sinful Village (1954)
 The Golden Plague (1954)
 One Woman Is Not Enough? (1955)
 The Priest from Kirchfeld (1955)
  Son Without a Home (1955)
 The Double Husband (1955)

References

External links
 

1881 births
1965 deaths
German stage actresses
German film actresses
German silent film actresses
Actresses from Munich
German radio actresses
20th-century German actresses